The Roman Catholic Diocese of Chikmagalur is a diocese located in the city of Chikmagalur in the Ecclesiastical province of Bangalore in India.

History
 16 November 1963: Established as Diocese of Chikmagalur from the Diocese of Mysore

Leadership
 Bishops of Chikmagalur (Latin Rite)
 Bishop Anthony Swamy Thomasappa (2 February 2007 – present)
 Bishop John Baptist Sequeira (26 January 1987 – 2 December 2006)
 Bishop Alphonsus Mathias (later Archbishop) (16 November 1963 – 12 September 1986)

References

External links
 GCatholic.org 
 Catholic Hierarchy 

Roman Catholic dioceses in India
Christian organizations established in 1963
Roman Catholic dioceses and prelatures established in the 20th century
1963 establishments in Mysore State
Christianity in Karnataka
Chikkamagaluru district